Magheralin is a civil parish largely in County Down, Northern Ireland. It is situated in the historic baronies of Iveagh Lower, Upper Half in County Down and Oneilland East (three townlands) in County Armagh.

Settlements
The civil parish contains the following settlements:
Dollingstown
Magheralin

Townlands
Magheralin civil parish contains the following townlands:

Ballykeel
Ballyleny
Ballymacanally
Ballymacateer
Ballymacbredan
Ballymacbrennan
Ballymacmaine
Ballymagin
Ballymakeonan
Ballynadrone
Clankilvoragh
Clogher
Derrylisnahavil
Donagreagh
Drumcro and Drumo
Drumlin
Drumnabreeze
Drumnaferry
Drumo and Drumcro
Edenballycoggill
Edenmore
Feney
Gartross
Gregorlough
Kilfullert
Kircassock
Lismaine
Lisnashanker
Lisnasure
Taughlumny
Taughrane
Tullyanaghan
Tullynacross

See also
List of civil parishes of County Down

References